Charles James Fox Bennett (11 June 1793 in Shaftesbury, England – 5 December 1883) was a merchant and politician who successfully fought attempts to take Newfoundland into Canadian confederation. Bennett was a successful businessman and one of the colony's richest residents with interests in the fisheries, distillery and brewery industry and shipbuilding. His brother Thomas Bennett, a magistrate and member of Newfoundland's first House of Assembly, was a partner in the business.

Bennett became involved in politics in the 1840s as a leader of the colony's Anglican community and an opponent of responsible government, an argument he lost when an alliance of Catholics and non-Anglican Protestants persuaded the Colonial Office to grant Newfoundland self-government.

In the 1860s, he led the Anti-Confederation Party opposing the proposals by Sir Frederick Carter to join Canada. Bennett's party defeated Carter's Conservatives on the Confederation issue in the 1869 elections, allowing Bennett to form a government in 1870. However, as Premier he was unable to keep his party united, and in 1874 resigned, allowing Carter to return to power. The issue of Confederation had become a moot point and would not be seriously raised again until the Great Depression.

Bennet also commissioned extensive mineral surveys along the coasts, and in the 1860s developed the prosperous copper mine at Tilt Cove (Notre Dame Bay).

Bennett's anti-Confederates reformed themselves into the colony's Conservative Party.

References

External links 
 

1793 births
1883 deaths
People from Shaftesbury
Premiers of Newfoundland Colony
British North American Anglicans
Persons of National Historic Significance (Canada)
Anti-Confederation Party politicians
English brewers
British merchants
English emigrants to pre-Confederation Newfoundland
Drink distillers
19th-century English businesspeople